Zbigniew Załuski (31 July 1926 in Kivertsi, Second Polish Republic – 5 March 1978 in Warsaw, People's Republic of Poland) was a Polish army officer, writer and Member of Parliament.

Life and military career
A native of the Wołyń Voivodeship, he was exiled to Kazakhstan in 1940, soon after the Soviet invasion. After joining the Polish People's Army in 1944, he participated in the Battles for Kolberg and Berlin. Załuski joined the Polish Workers' Party and attended the Academy for Political Education Officers, eventually reaching the rank of Colonel as a political officer.

He had a long journalistic career, mainly as an editor in the magazine Wojsko Ludowe (People's Army) and has written several books dealing with military history and Polish history. Załuski was also a screenwriter and a film consultant.

In 1969 he was elected member of the Sejm for the Polish United Workers Party (PZPR) and continued in the role until his death. In 1974 he joined the administrative board of the Polish–Soviet Friendship Society. Załuski also served as the chief of the PZPR cell in the Polish Writers Union, until his death from a heart attack.

Books
The Polish Seven Deadly Sins (Siedem polskich grzechów głównych).
Polish Army -Loyal Guards of the Homeland (Wojsko polskie – ojczyzny wierna straż).
Poles on the fronts of the Second World War (Polacy na frontach II wojny światowej).
The Year Forty Four (Czterdziesty czwarty).
The End, 1945 (Finał 1945).
Pass into History (Przepustka do historii).

Filmography
Then There Was Silence (Potem nastąpi cisza) - 1965.
Direction: Berlin (Kierunek Berlin) - 1968.
Last Days (Ostatnie Dni) - 1969.
Liberation - 1969-71.
Legend (Legenda) - 1970.
Victory (Zwycięstwo) - 1974.
Soldiers of Freedom - 1977.

References

External links
Zbigniew Załusky on IMDb.
Zbigniew Załusky in Filmpolsky.

1926 births
1978 deaths
People from Volyn Oblast
People from Wołyń Voivodeship (1921–1939)
Polish United Workers' Party members
Members of the Polish Sejm 1969–1972
Members of the Polish Sejm 1972–1976
Members of the Polish Sejm 1976–1980
Polish male writers
Military historians
20th-century Polish  historians
Polish military personnel of World War II
Polish deportees to Soviet Union
Recipients of the State Award Badge (Poland)